Lady Franklin Bay is an Arctic waterway in Qikiqtaaluk Region, Nunavut, Canada. The bay is located in Nares Strait northwest of Judge Daly Promontory and is an inlet into the northeastern shore of Ellesmere Island.

Fort Conger—formerly an Arctic exploration camp—is located on its northern shore.

Geography 
Lady Franklin Bay divides Grant Land to the north from Grinnell Land to the south.

The main bay contains one noted branch to the northwest known as Discovery Bay, and the interior lengths of Lady Franklin Bay extending southwest are sometimes shown on maps as Archer Fjord.

The landscape surrounding Lady Franklin Bay is generally barren rocks, with some very shallow glacial till held in place with frost and permafrost. However, the glaciers and icecaps of Ellesmere Island have not been known to inundate Lady Franklin Bay.

The main reach of this bay can be approached by ship if ice floe conditions allow, via Baffin Bay, to Smith Sound, to Kane Basin, through Kennedy Channel, and thus through Hall Basin to the entrance of the Bay. The historically favored point for beginning such Polar trips has been St. Johns.

The climate is typical Arctic Margin, with very light precipitation, short cold summers, and long cold winters in darkness. The summer natural food game observed at this Bay is limited to various mammals in the sea water, occasional muskox, and scattered sea birds seen overhead. Plants are limited to short season mosses and lichens.

History 
Sir John was lost within the Queen Elizabeth Islands south of Ellesmere Island. Lady Franklin subsequently became internationally well known by financing several different rescue expeditions to search for Sir John.

Lady Franklin Bay reached press headlines in the United States in the period 1880–1884 after the US Army Signal Corps chose and specified that site for a base camp to make an attempt to reach the North Pole. A party of 25 military men led by First Lieutenant Adolphus W. Greely as acting signal officer was successfully landed by the USS Proteus at Lady Franklin Bay in August 1881. A large frame structure was built on the northwest shore, and this home base camp was named Fort Conger.

References

Sources 
 Greely, A. W. (1886). Report of the U.S. Expedition to Lady Franklin Bay, 1885–86. 22. Gov. Pr. Off.
 Guttridge, L. F. (2000). The Ghosts of Cape Sabine. New York: G. P. Putnam's Sons.
 Annual Report of the Superintendent of the U.S. Coast & Geodetic Survey. 15. (1883). Gov. Pr. Off.
 Annual Report of the Chief Signal Officer. (1883). Gov. Pr. Off.
 RG27 Records. U.S. Weather Bureau. Polar Expeditions. College Park: National Archives.
 Fort Conger, Greely Expedition. July–August 1882. New York Explorers Club.

Bays of Qikiqtaaluk Region